Saint John's Episcopal Church is a historic Episcopal church located at Crawfordsville, Montgomery County, Indiana. It was built in 1837 by an Episcopal congregation, organized through missionary bishop Jackson Kemper, and is a one-story, gable fronted frame building in the Greek Revival style.  The original section measures 30 feet by 50 feet; a 30-foot rear addition was built in 1960.  Atop the roof is a belfry added about 1950.  It is the oldest remaining church building in Crawfordsville and Indiana's first Episcopal Church building.

It was listed on the National Register of Historic Places in 1985.

Theologian Hans Frei, a longtime Yale Divinity School faculty member and a significant figure in Post-liberal theology, briefly served as rector in the early 1950s.

References

Episcopal church buildings in Indiana
Churches on the National Register of Historic Places in Indiana
Churches completed in 1837
Greek Revival church buildings in Indiana
Buildings and structures in Montgomery County, Indiana
National Register of Historic Places in Montgomery County, Indiana
Crawfordsville, Indiana